Don Donald is a 1937 American animated short film produced by Walt Disney Productions and released by United Artists. The cartoon follows Donald Duck attempting to woo a female Mexican duck named Donna. It was directed by Ben Sharpsteen and features music by Paul J. Smith which was adapted from the Mexican folk songs "Cielito Lindo" and "Jarabe Tapatío." Clarence Nash voiced both Donald and Donna.

Although billed at the time as another Mickey Mouse cartoon, explaining the face of Mickey Mouse at the beginning of the original release, the film is actually the first installment of the Donald Duck series, and is the first to feature Donald as the primary starring character. The film also introduces a love interest for Donald.

Plot
Donald Duck rides Jenny the donkey through the Mexican desert playing a guitar and wearing a sombrero on his way to the house of his girlfriend, Donna Duck. Donna dances the Mexican Hat Dance and eventually lands on Donald's donkey who throws her off his back. Donald laughs causing Donna to get angry. She knocks Donald into a fountain, breaks his guitar over his head, and storms back inside the house.

Back outside, Jenny laughs at Donald's misfortunes. Donald decides to exchange Jenny for a car at a nearby trading post.

Donna is immediately won back with Donald's car. She lands in the rumble seat and gives Donald a big kiss. Together they speed off through the desert, but eventually the car has engine problems and stops working. Donald confidently tries to fix the problem but the car throws Donald out and speeds off without him. The rumble seat closes on Donna and she is trapped inside with Donald in pursuit. The car crashes, throwing Donna out of the rumble seat, across a waterhole, and into a mud puddle, and Donald laughs at her. Donna furious once again, grabs the car's horn and hits Donald with it, until he lands in some cacti and Donna shoves the horn in his mouth. Donna then rides off on her unicycle which she has conveniently carried with her in her purse, and declares their relationship over.

Donald, alone in the desert with Jenny who has escaped from the trading post, is furious at the car and throws the horn at it in retaliation. This however causes the car's radiator to explode and the hot water lands on Donald's sombrero, shrinking it. Jenny laughs yet again.

Donna Duck
It is unclear if Donna Duck simply represents an earlier version of Daisy Duck or is a separate character entirely. Donna was later retconned in a 1951 Disney comic strip as Daisy's rival.

Donna made several other appearances in the British magazine Mickey Mouse Weekly. Donna did not appear in any other films.

Releases
Source:
 January 9, 1937 – original release (theatrical)
 November 13, 1984 – Donald Duck's 50th Birthday (TV)
 1993 – The Adventures of Mickey and Donald, Episode 26 (TV)
 October 13, 1997 – Ink & Paint Club, Episode 4 "Disney Firsts" (TV)

Home media
The short was released on May 18, 2004 on Walt Disney Treasures: The Chronological Donald, Volume One: 1934-1941.

Additional releases include:
 1984 – "Cartoon Classics: Donald Duck's First 50 Years" (VHS)
 1987 – "Cartoon Classics: Starring Donald and Daisy" (VHS)
 January 11, 2005 – "Classic Cartoon Favorites: Starring Donald" (DVD)
 April 29, 2008 – bonus feature on the "Classic Caballeros Collection" (DVD)

See also
 Mickey Mouse (film series)

References

External links
 

1930s color films
1930s Disney animated short films
Donald Duck short films
Films set in Mexico
1937 animated films
1937 films
Films directed by Ben Sharpsteen
Films produced by Walt Disney
Films scored by Paul Smith (film and television composer)
1930s American films